Kochkino is a rural locality (a village) in Lobanovskoye Rural Settlement, Permsky District, Perm Krai, Russia. The population was 110 as of 2010. There are 3 streets.

Geography 
Kochkino is located 19 km south of Perm (the district's administrative centre) by road. Lobanovo is the nearest rural locality.

References 

Rural localities in Permsky District